Wade Allison may refer to:

Wade Allison (born 1941), British professor
Wade Allison (ice hockey) (born 1997), Canadian ice hockey player